Tillandsia pseudocardenasii is a species of flowering plant in the genus Tillandsia. This species is endemic to Bolivia.

References

pseudocardenasii
Flora of Bolivia